Rufin is a surname and a male given name. Notable people with this name include:

Given name
 Rufin Anthony (1940–2016), Pakistani Roman Catholic bishop
 Rufin Molomadan (born 1967), Central African Republic cyclist
 Rufin Oba (born 1976), Congolese football player
 Rufin Sudkovsky (1850–1885)
 Rufin Yambe (born 1981), Chadian football player

Surname
 Guillaume Rufin (born 1990), French tennis player
 Jean-Christophe Rufin (born 1952), French doctor, diplomat, historian, globetrotter and novelist
 Zomahoun Idossou Rufin (born 1964), Beninese diplomat in Japan

See also
 Ruffin (name)